Pierce Boston is a residential apartment and condo building located in the Fenway–Kenmore neighborhood of Boston, Massachusetts (USA), at the corner of Boylston Street and Brookline Avenue. The 30-story mixed-use development includes luxury condo, apartment, and retail components. It is the tallest building in the neighborhood. The name Pierce was chosen as it is the former location of gourmet supermarket S.S. Pierce.

Design

The building was originally proposed by Samuels & Associates in 2013 as a 22-story residential tower called The Point. It was the first Boston project by the Miami-based architecture firm Arquitectonica. The building is clad in glass and metal, with paneling in a pattern intended to reflect the masonry buildings around it.

The building contains retail space (floors 1–2), 240 apartments (floors 3–17), and 109 condominiums (floors 19–29). The 30th-floor level includes outdoor roof space, with a pool and hot tub for apartment and condo residents, a lounge and barbecue area for condo owners, and private roof decks for individual condos.

The apartment levels include 45 short-term rentals managed by Sonder. The retail space is home to a CB2, Tiffani Faison's Italian concept restaurant Orfano, The Wine Press, and Nathalie Wine Bar.

References

External links 

Skyscrapers in Boston
Residential buildings completed in 2018
Luxury real estate
Arquitectonica buildings